Gott sei dank … dass Sie da sind! is a German television series, based on the Australian comedy program Thank God You're Here.

See also
List of German television series

External links
 

2006 German television series debuts
2007 German television series endings
German-language television shows
German comedy television series
ProSieben original programming
Non-Australian television series based on Australian television series